The Speedway Grand Prix of Austria was a speedway event that was a part of the Speedway Grand Prix Series.

Previous winners

Classification

See also
 Sport in Austria

References

 
Austria
Grand Prix